Dalgaon is a town in Darrang district, Assam, India.

Dalgaon is also known for its Educational Instituations.

Geography
It is located at an elevation of 48 m above MSL.

Location
National Highway 15 passes through Dalgaon.

Politics
Dalgaon is part of Mangaldoi (Lok Sabha constituency).

References

External links
 Satellite map of Dalgaon

Cities and towns in Darrang district